Necton is a village situated on a turning off the A47 main road between Swaffham and East Dereham in the Breckland district of mid-Norfolk. It has a number of facilities including a primary school, playing field, social club, pub, post office a shop, a butchers and a Co-op and fuel station at the top of the village along the A47.

The place-name 'Necton' is first attested in the Domesday Book of 1086, where it appears as Nechetuna and Neketuna. The name means 'town or settlement by a neck of land'. (Necton is situated at the foot of a ridge.)

All Saints' church, dating from the 14th century, although its tower was rebuilt in the 19th century, is at the centre of the village in the Benefice of Necton. It is a grade I listed building. One of its main attractions is the hammerbeam and archbraced nave roof with its carved angels.

In the churchyard is a 14th-century grade II* listed table tomb reputed to be that of the Countess of Warwick.

There is an old mill dating back to 1782 that was in full working order until the 1960s. Necton tower mill had been converted into a single-storey dwelling with a flat roof by 1970, and it is presently a retail facility.

Necton Diner was a filming location for the locally-set film The Goob (2014).An electricity substation planned in the parish is seen as vital to the harnessing of offshore wind-generated power, connecting turbines in the North Sea to the National Grid.

Notable residents 
 Nathan Fake, electronic musician, grew up in the village.

Notes

Villages in Norfolk
Civil parishes in Norfolk
Breckland District